Sarah Heap (27 November 1870–14 July 1960) was a New Zealand physical education teacher. She was born in Ashton-under-Lyne, Lancashire, England on 27 November 1870.

References

1870 births
1960 deaths
New Zealand educators
People from Ashton-under-Lyne
English emigrants to New Zealand